Lucien Barbarin (July 17, 1956 – January 30, 2020) was an American trombone player. Barbarin toured internationally with the Preservation Hall Jazz Band and with Harry Connick Jr.

He made his debut at the age of six, playing drums in the Onward Brass Band, with his great-uncle Paul Barbarin.

In New Orleans, Barbarin performed locally. After Hurricane Katrina severely damaged his home in 2005, he said: "I'm not running from New Orleans. [...] I'm going to stay because I was born and raised here and I'm going to pass away here." He died from prostate cancer on January 30, 2020. He was just 63 years old.

Connick’s recording of "How Great Thou Art" from the CD Alone with My Faith is dedicated to him.

Discography

As leader
 It's Good to be Home, independent, 2007
 Little Becomes Much: Jazz at the Palm Court Vol. 3, Lucien Barbarin & the Palm Court Swingsters, GHB Records, 2000
 Trombone Tradition, Lucien Barbarin with Henry Chaix Trio, Jazz Connoisseur, 1989

As sideman
2019 Lady and the Tramp - Featured artist
2008 What a Night! A Christmas Album – Harry Connick Jr.
2007 Oh, My NOLA – Harry Connick Jr.
2007 Chanson du Vieux Carré : Connick On Piano, Volume 3 – Harry Connick Jr.
2004 Unforgivable Blackness – Wynton Marsalis
2004 Dancing In The Sky – Dr. Michael White
2003 The Marsalis Family: A Jazz Celebration – The Marsalis Family
2003 Shake That Thing – Preservation Hall Jazz Band
2003 Harry for the Holidays – Harry Connick Jr.
2002 Jazz From the Soul of New Orleans – Dr. Michael White
2002 My One and Only Love – Topsy Chapman And The Pro's
2001 Songs I Heard – Harry Connick Jr.
2000 Song for George Lewis – Dr. Michael White
1999 Mr. Jelly Lord – Wynton Marsalis
1999 Come By Me – Harry Connick Jr.
1997 Doc Cheatham & Nicholas Payton – Doc Cheatham & Nicholas Payton
1995 Star Turtle – Harry Connick Jr.
1994 Mo' Cream from the Crop – Leroy Jones
1993 When My Heart Finds Christmas – Harry Connick Jr.
1992 World on a String – Kermit Ruffins
1991 Blue Light, Red Light – Harry Connick Jr.
1976 Hurricane Jazz Band – Hurricane Jazz Band

Filmography
2019 Bolden (Movie) 
2011 Harry Connick Jr. – In Concert On Broadway (DVD) – Harry Connick Jr.
2011 Tradition is a Temple
2004 Only You: In Concert (PBS) – Harry Connick Jr.
2003 Harry for the Holidays (NBC) – Harry Connick Jr.
2003 The Marsalis Family: A Jazz Celebration (PBS) – The Marsalis Family
2000 Armstrong—When the Saints Go Marching In (PBS) – Lincoln Center Jazz Orchestra with Wynton Marsalis and special guests
1994 The Harry Connick Jr. Christmas Special (video) – Harry Connick Jr.
1993 The Harry Connick Jr. Christmas Special (CBS) – Harry Connick Jr.
1993 The New York Big Band Concert (Video) – Harry Connick Jr.

References

External links

 Lucien Barbarin on MySpace
 Lucien Barbarin, official website (last update: 2005)
 NOLA.com obituary

1956 births
2020 deaths
Jazz musicians from New Orleans
American jazz trombonists
Male trombonists
Louisiana Creole people
21st-century trombonists
21st-century American male musicians
American male jazz musicians
Preservation Hall Jazz Band members
Fairview Baptist Church Marching Band members